Thinking in Java is a book about the Java  programming language, written by Bruce Eckel and first published in 1998. Prentice Hall published the 4th edition of the work in 2006. The book represents a print version of Eckel’s “Hands-on Java” seminar.

Bruce Eckel wrote “On Java8” as a sequel for Thinking in Java and it is available in Google Play as an ebook.

Publishing history

Eckel has made various versions of the book publicly available online.

Reception
 Tech Republic says:
"The particularly cool thing about Thinking in Java is that even though a large amount of information is covered at a rapid pace, it is somehow all easily absorbed and understood. This is a testament to both Eckel’s obvious mastery of the subject and his skilled writing style."
 Linux Weekly News praised the book in its review.
 CodeSpot says:
"Thinking in Java is a must-read book, especially if you want to do programming in Java programing language or learn Object-Oriented Programming (OOP)."

Awards 
Thinking in Java has won multiple awards from professional journals:
 1998 Java Developers Journal Editors Choice Award for Best Book 
 Jolt Productivity Award, 1999
 2000 JavaWorld Readers Choice Award for Best Book
 2001 JavaWorld Editors Choice Award for Best Book 
 2003 Software Development Magazine Jolt Award for Best Book 
 2003 Java Developers Journal Readers Choice Award for Best Book 
 2007 Java Developer’s Journal Readers’ Choice Best Book

External links
 Official site

References
 

Computer programming books
Java (programming language)